Koka Nikoladze (born 30 September 1989, in Tbilisi) is a Georgian composer and sound artist based in Europe. He studied at the Tbilisi State Conservatoire, Musikhochschule Stuttgart and Norwegian Academy of Music. He studied composition with Zurab Nadarejshvili, Marco Stroppa and violin with Ernst Arakelov.

Works 

Nikoladze's compositions include:
2010 "Starshine" for guitar, violin and percussion, uses a prepared guitar
2011 "Poezdeplacement - Differentzeitmaßcope" for cembalo universale, violin and cello (Stuttgart micro tonality congress).
2011 "Luminarium" for piano, viola and clarinet for Le Balcon
2012 "Kepler Star Dj" for Piano, Timpani and electronics.
2012 he wrote his first opera "Vor dem Gesetz" [Kafka], which was premiered at Wilhelmspalais Stuttgart as a part of the opening ceremony of contemporary music theater studio.

References 

 "Projects page"
 "About page"
 "CES website"

1989 births
21st-century classical composers
21st-century male musicians
Classical composers from Georgia (country)
Living people
Male classical composers
Opera composers from Georgia (country)
State University of Music and Performing Arts Stuttgart alumni